Hey Arnold! is an American animated television series created by Craig Bartlett that aired on Nickelodeon from October 7, 1996 to June 8, 2004. The series centers on a fourth grader named Arnold Shortman, who lives with his grandparents in an inner-city boarding house. A total of 100 episodes aired over the course of five seasons. Hey Arnold!: The Movie, a feature-length film based on the series, was released theatrically on June 28, 2002. Hey Arnold!: The Jungle Movie, a television film based on the series, premiered on November 24, 2017 on Nickelodeon.

Series overview

Episodes
Note: Episodes are listed in the order in which they originally aired

Claymation shorts
Before the main series premiered, Craig Bartlett created three clay animation short films:
 Arnold Escapes From Church (1988)
 The Arnold Waltz (1990)
 Arnold Rides His Chair (1990) (shown on Sesame Street)
They featured four characters from Hey Arnold!: Arnold, Helga, Harold and Rhonda.

Pilot (1994)

Season 1 (1996–97)

Season 2 (1997–98)

Season 3 (1998)

Season 4 (1999)

Season 5 (2000–04)

Theatrical film (2002)

Television film (2017)

References

External links
 at IMDb

Lists of American children's animated television series episodes
Lists of American comedy television series episodes
Lists of Nickelodeon television series episodes
Hey Arnold!